Murphy High School may refer to:

 Murphy High School (Alabama), United States
 Murphy High School (North Carolina), United States